The 12963/12964 Mewar Express is a Superfast Express running from Hazrat Nizamuddin, New Delhi to Udaipur City. It traverses the  journey in 12 hours 20 minutes, with 16 halts in between. The erstwhile kingdom in southern Rajasthan encompassing Udaipur was called Mewar.

Another 12965/12966 Mewar Express was introduced to run between  & .

Service

Timings are:-  departure 19.00 hrs, reversing at  departure 02.05 hrs & arriving  at 07.20 hrs as 12963 Mewar Express. Udaipur City departure 18.15 hrs,  arrival 06.35 hrs as 12964 Mewar Express.

Another 12965/12966 Mewar Express was introduced to run between  & . Timings were:- Jaipur Junction departure 21.40 hrs; reversing at  departure 00.10 hrs, reversing at  departure 01.55 hrs & reversing at  departure 05.05 hrs, arriving Udaipur City at 07.00 hrs as 12965 Mewar Express. In return, Udaipur City departure 20.30 hrs, arriving Jaipur Junction at 05.50 hrs as 12966 Mewar Express. This train used to cover  in 9 hours 20 mins at speed of  & was a Superfast Express train.

Route & Halts

The service was withdrawn from 27/09/2008.

Traction
The 12963/12964 Mewar Express is hauled by Tughlakabad or Ghaziabad-based WAP-7 electric locomotive power from Udaipur City to  Hazrat Nizamuddin and vice versa.

The 12965/12966 Mewar Express was hauled by a Bhagat Ki Kothi-based WDP-4 / WDP-4B / WDP-4D diesel locomotive in its entire journey, until the service was withdrawn on 27/09/2008.

Accident 
On 21 October 2009, a Mewar Express train was stopped at red light signal in Mathura when a Goa Express train hit it from behind. There were 25 deaths.

External links 
"New train between Delhi, Udaipur", Press Trust of India/Rediff.com (18 August 2005).

Mewar Express (12963) Delhi to Udaipur
Mewar Express (12964) Udaipur to Delhi
Mewar Express Route Map

Transport in Udaipur
Transport in Delhi
Railway services introduced in 2005
Express trains in India
Rail transport in Haryana
Rail transport in Rajasthan
Rail transport in Delhi
Named passenger trains of India